Luther Andrews Dickinson (born January 18, 1973) is the lead guitarist and vocalist for the North Mississippi Allstars and the son of record producer Jim Dickinson. He is also known for being the lead guitarist for The Black Crowes. He hosts Guitar Xpress on the Video on Demand network Mag Rack.

Career
He was born in West Tennessee to Mary Lindsay and Jim Dickinson, a Memphis record producer.  Dickinson grew up playing concerts and gaining recording experience with his father and brother, Cody.  The family moved to the hills of North Mississippi in 1985. Dickinson made his recording debut in 1987, playing a metal-influenced guitar solo on "Shooting Dirty Pool" on The Replacements' album Pleased to Meet Me, which his father was producing. Dickinson befriended the musical families of Otha Turner, R. L. Burnside, and Junior Kimbrough. They were the inspiration for Luther and Cody Dickinson to form the North Mississippi Allstars in 1996. The North Mississippi Allstars have been nominated for three Grammy Awards in the Best Contemporary Blues category. Dickinson produced two records on Otha Turner, Everybody Hollerin' Goat and From Senegal To Senatobia.

In November 2007 Dickinson joined The Black Crowes.  His recording debut with the band was on Warpaint in 2008, and he has since appeared on the 2009 Black Crowes release Before the Frost...Until the Freeze. Dickinson decided not to join The Black Crowes for their 2013 tour. Dickinson currently tours with the North Mississippi Allstars and as a member of the Southern Soul Assembly.

In 2014, Gibson issued a signature model for him, the Luther Dickinson ES-335, with the most notable modification being the P-90 pickups replacing the standard humbuckers.

Jazz critic Ted Gioia chose Blues & Ballads: A Folksinger's Songbook, Volumes 1 & 2 (New West, 2016) for the eleventh spot on his list of the top 100 albums of the year.

His 2019 joint recording with Sisters of the Strawberry Moon, Solstice, was chosen as a 'Favorite Blues Album' by AllMusic.

Discography

Solo
 Onward and Upward (2009)
  Three Skulls and the Truth (Blues Bureau, 2012) with David Hidalgo, Mato Nanji
 Hambone's Meditations (Songs of the South, 2012)
 Rock 'n' Roll Blues (New West, 2014)
 Blues and Ballads: A Folksinger's Songbook, Vol. 1 & 2 (New West, 2016)

78 rpm
 2012: "Zip-a-Dee-Doo-Dah" / "Beautiful Dreamer (Tompkins Square)
 2012: "Nobody Knows the Trouble I've Seen" / "Peace in the Valley" (Tompkins Square)

As member
With DDT
 1994 Some of My Best Friends Are Blues 
 1999 Urban ObserverWith Gutbucket
 Where's the Man With the Jive?With North Mississippi Allstars
 2000 Shake Hands with Shorty 2001 51 Phantom 2003 Polaris 2004 Hill Country Revue: Live at Bonnaroo 2005 Electric Blue Watermelon 2006 Instant Live: Paradise Rock Club 2007 Songs of The South Presents: Mississippi Folk Music - Volume One 2008 Hernando 2011 Keys to the Kingdom 2013 World Boogie Is Coming 2017 Prayer for PeaceWith The Word
 The Word (2001)
 Soul Food (2015)

With Jim Dickinson
 2002 Free Beer Tomorrow 2006 Jungle Jim and the Voodoo Tiger 2007 Killers from SpaceWith The Black Crowes
 Warpaint (2008)
 Warpaint Live (2009)
 Before the Frost...Until the Freeze (2009)
 Croweology (2010)
 Wiser for the Time (2013)

With John Hiatt
 2005 Master of Disaster 2008 Same Old ManWith South Memphis String Band
 2010 Home Sweet Home 
 2012 Old Times There...With The Hill Country Revue
 2009 Make a Move 
 2010 Zebra RanchWith The Wandering
 2012 Go On Now, You Can't Stay Here: Mississippi Folk Music, Vol. 3With Bash & Pop
 2017 Anything Could HappenWith Sisters of the Strawberry Moon
 2019 SolsticeAs guest
With Calvin Russell
 1997 Calvin Russell 1997 Soldier 1999 SamWith Jimbo Mathus
 1997 Play Songs for Rosetta 2001 National Antiseptic 2003 Stop and Let the Devil Ride 2009 Jimmy the Kid 2015 Confederate BuddhaWith Jon Spencer Blues Explosion
 1998 Acme 1999 Xtra-Acme USAWith Othar Turner
 1998 Everybody Hollerin' Goat 1999 From Senegal to SenatobiaWith John Hermann
 2001 Smiling Assassin 2003 Defector 2004 Just Ain't RightWith Lucero
 2001 Lucero 2006 The Attic TapesWith Bob Frank
 2002 Keep on Burning 
 2008 Red Neck, Blue CollarWith Jim Lauderdale
 2013 Black Roses 2015 Soul Searching: Memphis, Vol. 1/Nashville, Vol. 2With others
 1987 Pleased to Meet Me,   The Replacements
 1999 The Tri-Tone Fascination, Shawn Lane
 1999 Horse of a Different Color, Willy DeVille
 2003 Who the Hell Is John Eddie?, John Eddie
 2005 Motivational Speaker, Alvin Youngblood Hart
 2006 The Man Who Lives for Love, Spencer Dickinson
 2009 Electric Revival, Zach Williams
 2009 Truth & Salvage Co., Truth & Salvage Co.
 2010 Hill Country Hoodoo, Jake Leg Stompers
 2011 Fixin' to Die, G. Love
 2012 Candy Store Kid, Ian Siegal & the Mississippi Mudbloods
 2012 Mutt, Cory Branan
 2013 American Kid, Patty Griffin
 2013 Hubcap Music, Seasick Steve
 2013 Riverman's Daughter, The Grahams
 2013 Small Town Talk (Songs of Bobby Charles), Shannon McNally
 2013 Turquoise, Devon Allman
 2015 Ol' Glory, JJ Grey & Mofro
 2015 Sonic Soul Surfer, Seasick Steve
 2015 Wild Heart, Samantha Fish
 2015 Wolf Den, Danielle Nicole
 2016 Matters of the Heart, Eric Lindell
 2017 Belle of the West, Samantha Fish
2017 Cypress Hotel, Ben Sparaco
 2017 Goofer Dust, Hoodoo Men
 2017 Southern Avenue, Southern Avenue
 2020 Love & Peace, Seasick Steve
 2020 Mississippi Suitcase, Peter Parcek

 Awards and nominations 

!
|-
|align=center|2020
|Up and Rolling| Grammy Award for Best Contemporary Blues Album
|
|rowspan="7"| 
|-
|align=center|2016
|Blues & Ballads (A Folksinger's Songbook: Volumes I & II)| Grammy Award for Best Traditional Blues Album
|
|-
|align=center|2012
|Hambone's Meditations| Grammy Award for Best Folk Album
|
|-
|align=center|2010
|Onward and Upward| Grammy Award for Best Traditional Folk Album
|
|-
|align=center|2005
|Electric Blue Watermelon|rowspan="3"| Grammy Award for Best Contemporary Blues Album
|
|-
|align=center|2002
|51 Phantom|
|-
|align=center|2000
|Shake Hands with Shorty''
|
|-

References

External links
 Official site

1973 births
American blues guitarists
American male guitarists
American rock guitarists
The Black Crowes members
Living people
Musicians from Memphis, Tennessee
People from DeSoto County, Mississippi
Guitarists from Tennessee
Provogue Records artists
Stony Plain Records artists
New West Records artists